Dennis Johnson (born 1949) is an American politician. He is a member of the North Dakota House of Representatives from the 15th District, serving since 1992. He is a member of the Republican party.

References

1949 births
21st-century American politicians
Living people
People from Benson County, North Dakota
Republican Party members of the North Dakota House of Representatives